2011 Draft may refer to:

Various sporting drafts
2011 AFL Draft
2011 CFL Draft
2011 Major League Baseball Draft
2011 MLS SuperDraft
2011 MLS Supplemental Draft
2011 NBA Draft
2011 NFL Draft
2011 NHL Entry Draft
2011 Rookie Draft
2011 WNBA Draft
2011 WPS Draft
2011 WWE Draft